The Village of Wrath (French: Le village de la colère) is a 1947 French drama film directed by Raoul André and starring Louise Carletti, Paul Cambo and Micheline Francey. The film's sets were designed by the art directors Louis Le Barbenchon and Raymond Nègre.

Synopsis
The inhabitants of a small village loathe a young woman who lives there who they consider to be a witch. A young stranger arrives in the area and he falls in love with the woman, to the disgust of the villagers who eventually drive them out.

Cast
 Louise Carletti as Marie de St-Aiguif
 Paul Cambo as Bencho
 Micheline Francey as 	Laurette
 Marcelle Géniat as La grand-mère
 Raymond Cordy as 	Richelieu
 Pierre Duncan as 	Un frère Archangias	
 René Klein as 	Un frère Archangias
 Marcel Lupovici as 	Jacques Le Majeur
 Roger Monteaux as 	Le curé
 Jean Parédès as 	Mascaret
 Léon Pauléon as 	Un frère Archangias
 Nicole Riche as 	Anna
 Maurice Schutz as 	Anne

References

Bibliography 
 Martin, Yves. Le cinéma français, 1946-1966: un jeune homme au fil des vagues. Editions Méréal, 1998.
 Palmer, Tim. Tales of the Underworld: Jean-Pierre Melville and the 1950s French Cinema. University of Wisconsin, 2003.

External links 
 

1947 films
French drama films
1947 drama films
1940s French-language films
Films directed by Raoul André
1940s French films